Harriet Philpin is a British actress. She played Bettan in the 1975 Doctor Who serial Genesis of the Daleks.

She also appeared in other series such as Blake's 7 and The Sweeney.

She famously appeared in the 1970s and 1980s as the wife of the Secret Lemonade Drinker (Julian Chagrin) in the well-known and often-repeated R. White's Lemonade advert in the UK.

External links
 

Year of birth missing (living people)
Living people
British television actresses
Place of birth missing (living people)